Debbie Black (born July 29, 1966) is an American women's basketball former player and current coach. During her professional career, Black played for the Women's National Basketball League in Australia, the American Basketball League and the Women's National Basketball Association. She retired from the Connecticut Sun of the WNBA in 2005. Black was an assistant coach for the Ohio State University before  being named the head coach of the Eastern Illinois University Women's Basketball team on May 16, 2013, in which position she continued until 2017.

College years
Born in  Philadelphia, Pennsylvania, Black is a 1984 graduate of Philadelphia's Archbishop Wood High School. Black played for Jim Foster (basketball) at St. Joseph's University and graduated in 1988. While there she helped lead the Hawks to two Philadelphia Big 5 championships and an Atlantic 10 Conference title. A multi-sport athlete, Black earned 12 varsity letters in basketball, field hockey, and softball.

USA Basketball

Black was named to the team representing the USA at the William Jones Cup competition in Taipei, Taiwan.  The USA team had a 7–1 record and won the gold medal in a close final against Japan, winning 56–54. Black had 8 rebounds and 3 steals in the competition.

WNBL career
Black played eight seasons with the Tasmanian Islanders (1989–96) of the WNBL in Australia. She helped the team win national titles in 1991 and 1995 before leaving to go to the ABL.

ABL career
Black played for the Colorado Xplosion and was also an All-Star selection for the ABL. Black is the only professional female basketball player to have accomplished, and is one of very few basketball players (male or female) ever to accomplish a quadruple double (10 points, 14 rebounds, 12 assists, 10 steals); she accomplished this feat against the Atlanta Glory on Dec. 8, 1996. She received Defensive Player of the Year honors in 1997.

WNBA career
Black was drafted 15th overall by the Utah Starzz in 2nd round of the 1999 WNBA Draft.  She then played for the Miami Sol from 2000 to 2002.  While playing for the Sol, she earned the WNBA Defensive Player of the Year Award at the age of 35. In 2003, Black was acquired by the Connecticut Sun during the dispersal draft. She played for the Sun until her retirement in 2005.

Throughout Black's basketball career, her energy, intensity, and toughness were well-known among her teammates and opponents alike.  Her relentless defense earned her the nickname "The Pest." At 5' 2.5", she was the shortest player in the WNBA, just half an inch shorter than Los Angeles Sparks point guard Shannon Bobbitt and just edging out Temeka Johnson. She is a half inch shorter than the shortest NBA player in history, Muggsy Bogues. During 1999 she played on the Utah Starzz with the tallest WNBA player, 7'2" Małgorzata Dydek.

Coaching career
Black entered the coaching ranks as an assistant to her college coach, Jim Foster at Vanderbilt in 1999-2000, with the team advancing to the second round of the NCAA tournament. She rejoined Foster at Ohio State in 2005. Her eight seasons there saw the Buckeyes make seven trips to the NCAA Tournament as she worked as a recruiter and specialist in developing guards. Several guards went on to play professionally in the WNBA or overseas. On May 16, 2013, Black was named the head coach of the Eastern Illinois Panthers. On March 7, 2017, Black's contract was not renewed as head coach of EIU. She endured budget cuts and layoffs during her time as coach and the university did not receive state funds for over a year. There were rumors of the school closing, but on June 6, 2016, President David Glassman sent a letter to the campus community stating the school will not close and that further cuts may come. Through all of this she managed to increase the number of wins the team had in her final season. Most recently she was an assistant coach at University of Tennessee Chattanooga.

Coaching Record

Playing stats

St. Joseph's University 
At graduation:
All-time career leader in assists (718)
All-time career leader in steals (572)
All-Atlantic 10 Conference, First Team, 1988
All-District, First Team, 1988
All-League, Second-team, 1986
All-Rookie team, 1985.
Inducted into the St. Joseph's Athletic Hall of Fame in 2000
Inducted into the Philadelphia Big Five Hall of Fame, 1995
Inducted into the St. Joseph's Basketball Hall of Fame, 1994
Inducted into the Bucks County chapter of the Pennsylvania Sports Hall of Fame, 2010

Professional 
At retirement:
WNBA - 8th in career steals (315)
WNBA - 10th in career assists (612)
WNBA - 1st in career steal-to-turnover ratio
WNBA - 4th in career steals per game (2.26)
WNBA - Defensive Player of the Year, 2001
ABL - All-time leader in steals (330)
ABL - 2nd all-time in assists (608)
ABL - Defensive Player of the Year, 1997

References

External links
Eastern Illinois University (EIU) Women's Basketball
Ohio State University (OSU) Women's Basketball
Black's bio on OSU's site
Retirement announcement
WNBA chat transcript
WNBA
ABL
Final ABL standings and more ABL information links
St. Joseph's University Women's Basketball
Daily Eastern News
President Glassman

1966 births
Living people
American expatriate basketball people in Australia
American women's basketball coaches
American women's basketball players
Basketball coaches from Pennsylvania
Basketball players from Philadelphia
Colorado Xplosion players
Connecticut Sun players
Eastern Illinois Panthers women's basketball coaches
Miami Sol players
Ohio State Buckeyes women's basketball coaches
Point guards
Saint Joseph's Hawks women's basketball players
Utah Starzz draft picks
Utah Starzz players
Vanderbilt Commodores women's basketball coaches